Kouniana is a village and commune in the Cercle of Koutiala in the Sikasso Region of southern Mali. The commune covers an area of 79 square kilometers and includes 2 settlements. In the 2009 census it had a population of 3,294. The village of Kouniana, the administrative centre (chef-lieu) of the commune, is 45 km northeast of Koutiala.

References

External links
.

Communes of Sikasso Region